The 2002–03 season was the 102nd season in Athletic Bilbao's history and their 72nd consecutive season in La Liga, the top division of Spanish football.

Season summary

In Jupp Heynckes's second season in charge, Athletic Bilbao made a slight improvement in the league, climbing from ninth to seventh place, their highest placing since finishing as runners-up in 1997–98. They were eliminated from the Copa del Rey at the last 32 stage by Basque rivals Real Unión, who were ranked two divisions below Athletic, in Segunda División B.

Heynckes departed at the end of the season to take up the manager's role at Schalke 04 in his native Germany. He was replaced by former Bilbao player Ernesto Valverde, who was promoted from coaching the B team.

Squad statistics

Appearances and goals

|}

Results

La Liga

League table

See also
2002–03 La Liga
2002–03 Copa del Rey

External links

References

Athletic Bilbao
Athletic Bilbao seasons